Noukeu Fernande Tchétché (born 20 June 1988) is an Ivorian defensive professional footballer. She was part of the Ivorian squad for the 2015 FIFA Women's World Cup.

See also
List of Ivory Coast women's international footballers

References

External links
 
 Profile at FIF 

1988 births
Living people
Place of birth missing (living people)
Ivorian women's footballers
Women's association football defenders
Ivory Coast women's international footballers
2015 FIFA Women's World Cup players